Midway Plantation is a historic plantation house located near Fort Motte, Calhoun County, South Carolina. The original Midway plantation was built about 1785, although little of this structure remains. The present façade was added about 1859, and is a two-story antebellum frame building with both Greek Revival and Federal influences. The front façade features a pediment and a two-tiered portico with four Tuscan order columns on both levels. The rear wing and porch were added around 1900.

It was listed in the National Register of Historic Places in 1976.

References

Plantation houses in South Carolina
Houses on the National Register of Historic Places in South Carolina
Federal architecture in South Carolina
Greek Revival houses in South Carolina
Houses completed in 1859
Houses in Calhoun County, South Carolina
National Register of Historic Places in Calhoun County, South Carolina